"Blessings" is a song recorded by American country music duo Florida Georgia Line. It was the third and final single from their fourth studio album Can't Say I Ain't Country. Tyler Hubbard and Brian Kelley, the duo's two members, co-wrote the song with Tom Douglas, Jesse Frasure, Jordan Schmidt, and Ernest Keith Smith. It is their lowest-peaking single to date, missing the top 20 of the Billboard Country Airplay and Hot Country Songs charts.

Content and history
Tom Roland of Billboard called the song a "nifty patchwork of homespun phrases, acoustic accents and sweet melody is a satisfying package wrapped with an understated reminder: Always take time to count your blessings." Duo member Brian Kelley began writing the song with Jordan Schmidt and Ernest K. Smith. Smith came up with the idea to write the song's main guitar progression in DADGAD tuning after learning about the tuning in a Guitar Center. The duo then refined the song with the assistance of Tom Douglas, who added a verse, and Jesse Frasure, who assisted in arrangements. Produced by Joey Moi, the song features Ilya Toshinsky on acoustic guitar, Russ Pahl on pedal steel guitar, Jerry Roe on snare drums, and Dave Cohen on Hammond organ.

The duo released a music video for the song on December 4, 2019. It features scenes of them with their wives and families.

Chart performance
"Blessings" peaked at number 23  on both the Hot Country Songs and the Country Airplay, representing the duo's lowest showing on either chart to date. It also became their first official single to fail to chart the Billboard Hot 100 altogether: ending a string of sixteen consecutive charting single releases.

Weekly charts

Year-end charts

Certifications

References

2019 songs
2020 singles
Big Machine Records singles
Florida Georgia Line songs
Songs written by Tyler Hubbard
Songs written by Brian Kelley (musician)
Songs written by Tom Douglas (songwriter)
Songs written by Jesse Frasure
Songs written by Ernest (musician)
Songs written by Jordan Schmidt
Song recordings produced by Joey Moi